Cadlina affinis is a species of sea slug or dorid nudibranch, a marine gastropod mollusk in the family Cadlinidae.

Distribution 
This species was described from four specimens trawled at McMurdo Sound at the following positions , 293 m., 547 m. and off Granite Harbour, entrance to McMurdo Sound, 92 m.

References

Cadlinidae
Gastropods described in 1934